North Riding may mean:

 North Riding of Yorkshire, England
 North Riding of Lindsey, Lincolnshire, England
 North Tipperary, Republic of Ireland